PepB aminopeptidase (Salmonella enterica serovar Typhimurium peptidase B) is an enzyme which catalyses the following chemical reaction:

 Release of an N-terminal amino acid, Xaa, from a peptide or arylamide.

Xaa is preferably Glu or Asp, but may be other amino acids, including Leu, Met, His, Cys and Gln.

References

External links 
 

EC 3.4.11